La Niña is the second studio album by Spanish singer Lola Indigo. It was released on July 2, 2021, through Universal Music Spain. Its expected release is preceded by three singles: "Cómo te Va?" featuring Spanish singer Beret, "Calle" featuring Puerto Rican rappers Guaynaa and Cauty and the solo release "Spice Girls". Other vocal collaborations include Tini, Belinda, Khea, Mala Rodríguez, Lyanno and Roy Borland. In the deluxe edition of the album, which includes the top ten singles "4 Besos" and "Lola Bunny", Rauw Alejandro, Lalo Ebratt and Don Patricio also appear as vocal collaborators. The aesthetic of the album revolves around pink and bubblegum culture, mainly inspired in fashion dolls.

Background 
During 2020 Indigo stated that she was working on her next record. During that year she released quite a few singles. In March, "4 Besos", featuring Rauw Alejandro and Lalo Ebratt, became a top ten hit in Spain and also entered the charts in Ecuador. In June, she released the promotional single "Mala Cara", which she premiered at the final episode of Operación Triunfo. Later, she teamed up with Danna Paola and Denise Rosenthal for "Santería", which was well received by both the press and the public, becoming a top twenty hit in Spain, Uruguay and Chile and also entering the charts in Mexico. In October, Indigo collaborated by Spanish singer and rapper Beret on "Cómo te Va?", which was certified Gold in her home country and was accompanied by a music video starring actor Miguel Herrán. The year later, Indigo released "Calle" featuring Puerto Rican rappers Guaynaa and Cauty and spawned the solo release "Spice Girls".

During the first months of 2021, Indigo teased the album to be called "La Niña" and released a temptative cover on May 6. Both the tracklist and release date were revealed through social media on June 4 meanwhile the final and definitive cover was released a week later alongside the pre-order. The cover art, designed, produced and portrayed by design studio Super Fuerte, received positive reviews.

Track listing

Charts

Weekly charts

Year-end charts

References 

2021 albums
Spanish-language albums
Universal Music Spain albums